The 2015–16 Illinois Fighting Illini men's basketball team represented the University of Illinois at Urbana–Champaign in the 2015–16 NCAA Division I men's basketball season. Led by fourth year head coach John Groce, the Illini played their home games at State Farm Center and were members of the Big Ten Conference. In November 2015, the Prairie Capital Convention Center in Springfield, Illinois hosted Illinois Fighting Illini men's basketball for five games while renovations to the State Farm Center were completed. They finished the season 15–19, 5–13 in Big Ten play to finish in 12th place. The Illini defeated Minnesota and Iowa to advance to the quarterfinals of the Big Ten tournament, where they lost to Purdue.

Previous season
The Fighting Illini finished the 2014-15 Season with an overall record of 19–14, 9–9 in Big Ten play to finish in a tie for seventh place. They lost in the second round of the Big Ten tournament to Michigan. They were invited to the NIT where they lost in the first round to Alabama.

Offseason

Departures

2015 recruiting class
On March 5, 2015 Illinois signee Jalen Coleman-Lands was named one of 26 high school seniors who participated in the Jordan Brand Classic on April 17, 2015, at the Barclays Center in Brooklyn, New York. Coleman-Lands is the second Illini to be selected to play in the Jordan Classic, joining Dee Brown who played for the Red team in 2002.

Incoming transfer students
Darius Paul was immediately eligible to play during the 15-16 season due to the junior college student transfer exception rules of the NCAA. While overseas on Illinois' preseason European trip, Paul was arrested in Deauville, France on August 14, 2015 and charged with vandalism, public intoxication and resisting arrest. Head coach John Groce later dismissed Paul from the Illinois basketball team on August 21, 2015.

Khalid Lewis and Mike Thorne Jr. are immediately eligible to play during the 15-16 season due to the graduate student transfer exception rules of the NCAA. Kipper Nichols was granted release of his scholarship from Tulane on September 22, 2015. He will join Illinois before the spring 2016 semester, and will be ineligible to play as a redshirt transfer until the spring of 2017.

2016 Recruiting class
On September 16, 2015, Te'Jon Lucas of Milwaukee, Wisconsin verbally committed to attend Illinois in the fall of 2016 and signed his National Letter of Intent to finalize his recruitment on November 11, 2015. Lucas attended the NBA Top 100 camp in June 2015, had scholarship offers from California, Memphis, Purdue, and Wisconsin, and he strongly considered both USC and Old Dominion before committing to Illinois. Lucas is only the third player from the State of Wisconsin to commit to Illinois, and is the first since 1926.

2017 Recruiting class
On January 16, 2016, Javon Pickett of Belleville, Illinois verbally committed to attend Illinois in the fall of 2017. Pickett committed after having scholarship offers from Drake, Illinois State, Southern Illinois Edwardsville, Saint Louis University and Tennessee State. During Illinois' final home game against Minnesota on February 28, 2016, Da'Monte Williams verbally committed to attend Illinois in the fall of 2017. Williams is the son of former Illinois guard Frank Williams,  who led the Fighting Illini to three straight NCAA men's basketball tournament appearances, including an Elite Eight appearance in 2001.

Roster

Depth chart

Updated 2015-12-10

Regular season

Injuries
Coach Groce announced on July 3 that incoming freshman Jalen Coleman-Lands had suffered a stress fracture and would be held out from basketball activities indefinitely. The injury forced Coleman-Lands to miss the team's European exhibition trip at the beginning of August.  However, Coleman-Lands was cleared for basketball activities at the end of September and played in the team's exhibition game against the University of Illinois at Springfield on November 8.

On July 28, Coach Groce announced that redshirt graduate student point guard Tracy Abrams had suffered an Achilles tendon rupture during summer workouts which would cause him to miss the entire 2015-16 season. The injury forced Abrams to use his second medical redshirt so he can return for the 2016-17 season for a sixth year of eligibility.

On October 8, it was announced that sophomore Leron Black would miss 4–6 weeks after having surgery to repair a meniscus tear in his knee. Black returned to the lineup during the win against North Dakota State on November 15, 2015. However, in the game against North Dakota State, Black suffered a contusion on his  repaired knee. After sitting out games against Yale and University of Illinois at Chicago, Coach Groce announced on December 17, 2015 that Black would be out indefinitely due to persistent swelling and soreness in his knee.

On October 20, Coach Groce announced that junior Kendrick Nunn would miss about 8 weeks after having surgery to repair a torn ligament in his left thumb.

During the first half of the season opener loss to North Florida, junior point guard Jaylon Tate suffered a dislocated finger that required surgery later that evening.

Both Nunn and Tate returned from injuries during a win against UAB in Niceville, Florida.

During the first half of a loss to Iowa State, graduate transfer Mike Thorne, Jr. suffered a meniscus tear in his left knee. He will be out indefinitely.

Schedule and results

|-
!colspan=12 style="background:#; color:#;"| European trip

|-
!colspan=12 style="background:#; color:#;"| Exhibition

|-
!colspan=12 style="background:#; color:#;"| Non-conference regular season

|-
!colspan=12 style="background:#; color:#;"| Big Ten regular season 

|-
!colspan=12 style="background:#; color:#;"| Big Ten tournament

References

Illinois
Illinois Fighting Illini men's basketball seasons
Illinois Fighting Illini men's b
Illinois Fighting Illini men's b